Anthony Ainley (20 August 1932 – 3 May 2004) was a British actor. He was the fourth actor to portray the Master in Doctor Who.

Early life
Ainley was born in Stanmore, Middlesex, the son of the actor Henry Ainley, on 20 August 1932, although his birth was not registered until January 1938 at around the time that he was admitted to the actors' orphanage. The birth certificates of Anthony and his brother Timothy identify their mother as Clarice Holmes and it is under this surname that they are recorded in the Official Register. Although no father is named on the birth certificates, Timothy's marriage certificate identifies Henry Ainley as his father.

Under the name of Anthony Holmes, Ainley attended Cranleigh School from 1947 to 1950. His first job was as an insurance clerk, which was followed by a period at RADA. He won the Fabia Drake Prize for Comedy whilst at RADA. His half-brother, Richard Ainley, was also an actor.

Career
Ainley's swarthy appearance tended to get him parts as villains, though an early regular role on British television was as Det. Sgt Hunter, sidekick to William Mervyn's Chief Inspector Rose in the second series of It's Dark Outside in 1966. Other notable roles include a subaltern in the 1969 film version of Oh! What a Lovely War, Dietz in the 1974 film version of The Land That Time Forgot, Reverend Fallowfield in the Tigon film The Blood on Satan's Claw (1971), Henry Sidney in Elizabeth R (1971), Clive Hawksworth in Spyder's Web (1972), Rev. Emilius in the BBC's adaptation of The Pallisers (1974), Johnson in the first episode of the BBC programme Secret Army (1977), and Sunley in The Avengers episode "Noon Doomsday" (1968). He was also one of the Hong Kong policemen who discover James Bond's supposed corpse in the opening sequence of You Only Live Twice (1967). Ainley played the role of the wealthy young peer Lord Charles Gilmour in the LWT series Upstairs, Downstairs (1973).

Doctor Who

Reportedly, it was his performance as Rev. Emilius (in The Pallisers) that led to him being offered the role of the Master by John Nathan-Turner, who had worked on The Pallisers seven years before becoming producer of Doctor Who. Ainley first portrayed the Master in the 1981 serial The Keeper of Traken and appeared in almost every season up until the cancellation of the original series in 1989, including its final serial, Survival.

Ainley's Doctor Who appearances included:
The Keeper of Traken (1981),
Logopolis (1981),
Castrovalva (1982),
Time Flight (1982),
The King's Demons (1983),
The Five Doctors (1983),
Planet of Fire (1984),
The Mark of the Rani (1985),
The Ultimate Foe (1986)
and Survival (1989).

He later reprised the role for the 1997 BBC computer game Destiny of the Doctors.

Ainley's great love of the role is often cited in documentaries and DVD commentaries. Script editor Eric Saward claimed that he introduced himself over the phone by saying "This is the Master" and then would laugh. In the commentary and documentary for The Mark of the Rani, both Colin Baker and Kate O'Mara say that "He only ever wanted to play the Master." Baker remarked that he could afford this luxury because he had built up a private income by the mid-1980s and had inherited a considerable sum of money from his father. In "Cat Flap: Making of Survival", Sylvester McCoy confirms that all he ever wanted to be is the Master, and he kept his role active, even when not on set. "He was as scary off camera as he was on it."

Personal life
Ainley remained unmarried throughout his life. He joked on the DVD commentary for The Keeper of Traken (which was recorded shortly before his death) that he did not like the three rings of marriage: the engagement ring, the wedding ring and the bickering.

Ainley was a keen sportsman. Initially he was a rugby player, he played at fly-half for the Old Cranleighans, Richmond and Middlesex. Later he turned his attentions to cricket, citing Sophie Aldred (who played Ace) as his friend once he learned that she played the game. He appeared on many occasions for the Stage and London Theatres C.C. mainly as an opening batsman.

Death
Ainley died in Harrow, London, on 3 May 2004, at the age of 71. He was known to be reclusive, remaining out of the public eye for most of his life after Doctor Who ended in 1989.

With his death, Geoffrey Beevers, who preceded him in the role, became the last surviving actor to play the Master in the classic series.

Biography
In 2015, Fantom Publishing published the biography of Anthony Ainley - The Man Behind the Master by Karen Louise Hollis. This came out in hardback, followed by paperback and audiobook. https://www.fantompublishing.co.uk/product/man-behind-master/

Filmography
Film

Television

References

External links
 
 Obituary in The Guardian  in The Independent''

1932 births
2004 deaths
People educated at Cranleigh School
Deaths from cancer in England
English male film actors
English male television actors
People from Stanmore
Alumni of RADA
20th-century English male actors